The 1995 Hamilton Tiger-Cats season was the 38th season for the team in the Canadian Football League and their 46th overall. The Tiger-Cats finished in 4th place in the North Division with an 8–10 record. They appeared in a North Semi-Final game but lost to the Calgary Stampeders. It was Hamilton's first ever post-season meeting with the Stampeders, as well as the only non-Grey Cup postseason game in the history of professional Canadian football to be played between teams that did not face one another in the regular season.

Offseason

CFL Draft

Preseason

Regular season

Season standings

Schedule

Postseason

Awards and honours

1995 CFL All-Stars

References

Hamilton Tiger-Cats seasons
Hamilton Tiger-cats Season, 1995